Stephanie Frazier Stacy (born April 23, 1962) is an American judge who is an associate justice of the Nebraska Supreme Court. She previously served as a judge on the Third District Court from 2011 to 2015. Stacy was appointed to the state's supreme court by the Governor of Nebraska Pete Ricketts in August 2015.

Education
Stacy completed a bachelor's degree in criminal justice at the University of Nebraska Omaha in 1988, and a J.D. degree at the University of Nebraska–Lincoln College of Law in 1991. She clerked for U.S. magistrate judge Dave Piester of the United States District Court for the District of Nebraska in 1991–1993.

Career
Stacy worked as an attorney in private practice in Lincoln, Nebraska from 1993 to 2011, rising to become a partner in the law firm Baylor, Evnen, Curtiss, Grimit & Witt LLP. She was a member of the Lincoln Bar Association's Board of Trustees from 2006 to 2009, and also taught law at the University of Nebraska–Lincoln in 2005–2011 as an adjunct faculty member.

In October 2011, Stacy was appointed as a judge by the Governor of Nebraska Dave Heineman, serving on the state's Third District Court, which is responsible for Lancaster County, Nebraska. She was retained to the 3rd District with 77.8% of votes for a new judicial term on November 4. 2014.

Governor Pete Ricketts appointed Stacy to the Nebraska Supreme Court in 2015, to replace retiring justice Kenneth Stephan in representing the 1st Judicial District. Stacy's appointment was announced on August 14, and she was sworn in on September 28, 2015. Justice Stacy's current term on the court ends in January 2019, and she is eligible to run for re-election in November 2018, for a new six-year term.

References

1962 births
Living people
University of Nebraska Omaha alumni
University of Nebraska alumni
Justices of the Nebraska Supreme Court
Nebraska lawyers
20th-century American lawyers
21st-century American lawyers
21st-century American judges
21st-century American women judges
20th-century American women